is a 2003 comedy film written and directed by Kazuyuki Izutsu, starring Toshiyuki Nishida. It is about a James Brown-obsessed gangster's last day of freedom before he starts a 5-year prison term.

Plot
Hanemura is the head of a yakuza clan enjoying his last taste of freedom before starting a prison sentence.  He tells the members of his 'family' to disband the clan and go straight. However, his clan 'brother' believes the clan can be saved if they arrange for James Brown to give Hanemura a private performance before he enters prison.

The gang mistakenly kidnaps an American James Brown impersonator, who is himself being hunted by aides of the Japanese Prime Minister, who want to recover incriminating materials that he unwittingly brought into the country.

Meanwhile, Hanemura is using his last day of freedom to track down the daughter he hasn't seen for 25 years.

These plots get entangled when it emerges that his daughter runs the talent agency that had brought the James Brown impersonator to Japan in the first place.

After many complications, father and daughter are reunited, Hanemura saves his daughter's company by performing a James Brown routine and his prison sentence is quashed.

Cast
 Toshiyuki Nishida as Hanemura, the Yakuza boss
 Takako Tokiwa as Kaori
 Tarō Yamamoto as Taro
 Ittoku Kishibe as Kaneyama
 Kenta Kiritani as Haruhiko
 Kohei Yoshida as Kenji
 Keiji Nagatsuka as Okabe
 Willie Raynor as James Brown impersonator
 Adeyto as Marilyn Monroe impersonator

Production
The Japanese title "Geroppa!" is the Japanese transliteration of the lyric "Get up!" from the James Brown song "Get Up (I Feel Like Being A) Sex Machine". Mixing slapstick, soul music and tearjerking elements, the plot involves a kidnapped James Brown impersonator, a plot to discredit the Japanese Prime Minister, an adulterous hotel manager, and a daughter who hasn't seen her father for 25 years.

Release
The film screened at the Busan International Film Festival on October 5, 2003.

Reception
Toshiyuki Nishida was nominated for the Best Actor award at the 2004 Japanese Academy Awards for his performance as the head of a yakuza clan.

References

External links

2003 films
2000s musical comedy-drama films
Yakuza films
Japanese musical comedy-drama films
Films directed by Kazuyuki Izutsu
2003 comedy films
2003 drama films
2000s Japanese films